The Echols Memorial Christian Church, now home to the Vietnamese Baptist Church, is a historic church building at 2801 Alabama Avenue in Fort Smith, Arkansas.  It is a large rectangular brick and stone structure, with a square tower at its southwest corner.  Its roof has a cross gable configuration, with large Gothic stained-glass in the gable ends.  The main entrance is set in the tower recessed in a Gothic-arched opening.  Built in 1911 with funds donated by Mrs. Elizabeth Echols, it is an excellent local example of Late Gothic styling built using local materials.

The building was listed on the National Register of Historic Places in 2006.

See also
National Register of Historic Places listings in Sebastian County, Arkansas

References

Churches on the National Register of Historic Places in Arkansas
Gothic Revival church buildings in Arkansas
Churches completed in 1911
Churches in Sebastian County, Arkansas
Buildings and structures in Fort Smith, Arkansas
National Register of Historic Places in Sebastian County, Arkansas
1911 establishments in Arkansas